Donald Stewart "Hammy" Gillespie (August 23, 1898 – January 6, 1973) was a Canadian professional ice hockey player. He played for the Edmonton Eskimos in the Western Canada Hockey League in the 1921–22 season. Previously, he also played with Selkirk of the Manitoba Hockey Association. He died suddenly at Saskatoon, Saskatchewan in 1973. He was buried at Woodlawn Cemetery in the same city.

References

External links

1898 births
1973 deaths
Edmonton Eskimos (ice hockey) players
Ice hockey people from Winnipeg
Canadian ice hockey defencemen